Prorasea gracealis is a moth in the family Crambidae. It was described by Eugene G. Munroe in 1974. It is found in North America, where it has been recorded from California.

References

Evergestinae
Moths described in 1974